Magnetic south may refer to:

 South magnetic pole
 South Pole, one of the two points where the Earth's axis of rotation intersects its surface
 Magnetic South (album) an album from Michael Nesmith